Cambridge University Lightweight Rowing Club (CULRC) was the University rowing club for lightweight male oarsmen at the University of Cambridge, principally to race against Oxford University Lightweight Rowing Club (OULRC) annually in the Lightweight Men's Boat Race.

In April 2020 it was agreed that CULRC would combine with the openweight men's club CUBC and the women's club CUWBC into one club.  The merger took place on 1 August 2020. CUBC now selects a lightweight men's Blue Boat from the men's squad to represent Cambridge at the Lightweight Boat Races.

History 
The club was founded in 1974 by Richard Bates and raced against Oxford in 1975. These races were the basis on which the Henley Boat Races were later founded. For more than twenty five years Robert Greatorex presided over the club. In recent years, the club fielded two crews each year, the lightweight Blue Boat and Granta, the lightweight reserve crew. The reserve boat, Granta, raced Oxford's equivalent, Nephthys, from 2000 until 2007 and restarted racing Oxford in a pairs race in recent years.

For a brief period in 1999 - 2002 there was an active old boys club "Farmer" whose finest race was beating the 1999 Nephthys crew by 2L.

The Blue Boat crew have the right to wear a distinctive uniform. As a half blue sport, they wear a unique Cambridge blue and white striped blazer with the club insignia on the chest pocket. This blazer design has been retained by the Blue Boat upon merger with CUBC. Blue Boat oarsmen who go on to win a round of the Temple Challenge Cup or Prince Albert Challenge Cup at Henley Royal Regatta in the same season as their Boat Race are awarded Discretionary Full Blues and are entitled to wear a Cambridge blue blazer with the club insignia on the chest pocket. Granta members who race in the Reserve race against Nepthys are entitled to wear the Granta Colours blazer, the same design as the Blue Boat but without the club insignia on the chest pocket.

Past Crews
This is a list of CULRC/CUBC crews who have raced the men's lightweight boat race against Oxford

 Denotes President

Reserve crews (Granta) 
This is a list of CULRC/CUBC Granta crews who have raced the Lightweight Reserve Race against Oxford.

International representation
 2016 Rio — Mark Aldred GBR LM4- 
 2014 World Rowing Championships, Amsterdam — Mark Aldred GBR LM4- - Bronze
 2013 World Rowing Championships, Chungju — Mark Aldred GBR LM2- - Bronze
 2012 London — Roderick Chisholm (rower) Aus LM2x - 13th place 
 2008 Beijing — Roderick Chisholm (rower) Aus LM4- - 9th place 
 2004 Athens — Nick English GB   LM4- - 13th place 
 2000 Sydney — Tom Middleton GB  LM2x - 14th place

See also
University rowing (UK)
Cambridge University Combined Boat Club - responsible for the day-to-day running of college rowing in Cambridge
Cambridge University Women's Boat Club
Cambridge University Boat Club

References

External links
CULRC
Cambridge University Combined Boat Clubs
Henley Boat Races

Sports clubs established in 1974
 
Rowing clubs in Cambridgeshire
Rowing clubs of the River Cam
Rowing clubs of the River Great Ouse